Brian Fies (pronounced "feez" ) is an American cartoonist. He is the creator of Mom's Cancer, which was the first webcomic to receive an Eisner Award. Fies won the Eisner in 2005 under the newly created category "Best Digital Comic". Mom's Cancer also won Fies a Harvey Award, in the Best New Talent category, as well as the Lulu Blooker Prize in its Comics category. The German edition of the graphic novel received the Deutscher Jugendliteraturpreis (German Youth Literature Prize) in the Non-Fiction category. Mom's Cancer was also nominated for a Quill Award and two further Eisner Awards.

Fies is also the creator of The Last Mechanical Monster, which was also nominated for an Eisner Award in 2014. Other works by Fies include Whatever Happened to the World of Tomorrow? and the 18-page webcomic A Fire Story (later expanded to a 154-page book) which recounts the devastation caused by California wildfires in 2017 which destroyed his home.

Fies was given an Inkpot Award in 2018.

References 

Year of birth missing (living people)
Living people
American cartoonists